In India, a Community development block (CD block) or simply Block is a sub-division of Tehsil, administratively earmarked for planning and development. The area is administered by a Block Development Officer (BDO), supported by several technical specialists and village-level workers. A community development block covers several gram panchayats, the local administrative units at the village level.

Nomenclature
Only in the state of West Bengal are CD blocks considered the third level administrative units (equal to tehsils in North India. Elsewhere, tehsils are also called Talukas in the Western Indian states of Goa, Gujarat, Maharashtra and South Indian states of Karnataka, Kerala, and Tamil Nadu. In Arunachal Pradesh and Nagaland, the term Circles are used, while Sub-divisions are present in the Eastern Indian states of Bihar, Jharkhand, Assam, and most of Northeast India (Manipur, Meghalaya, Mizoram, Sikkim and Tripura). In Andhra Pradesh and Telangana, a newer form of administrative unit called Mandals have replaced the Tehsil.

The state of Gujarat has a different structure, District Collector or Divisional Magistrate (DM), then Sub Divisional Magistrate (SDM) i.e. Deputy Collector administering two or more talukas. The sub-division is divided into taluks.

History
The concept of the community development block was first suggested by Grow More Food (GMF) Enquiry Committee in 1952 to address the challenge of multiple rural development agencies working without a sense of common objectives. Based on the committee's recommendations, the community development programme was launched on a pilot basis in 1952 to provide for a substantial increase in the country's agricultural programme, and for improvements in systems of communication, in rural health and hygiene, and in rural education and also to initiate and direct a process of integrated culture change aimed at transforming the social and economic life of villagers. The community development programme was rapidly implemented. In 1956, by the end of the first five-year plan period, there were 248 blocks, covering around a fifth of the population in the country. By the end the second five-year plan period, there were 3,000 blocks covering 70 per cent of the rural population. By 1964, the entire country was covered.

Block Development Officer
In India, a Civil service officer of the rank of Block Development Officer (BDO) is the in-charge of a CD Block in India. BDO are usually officers of representative state-governments. BDO reports to the Sub Divisional Magistrate (SDM).

Blocks statewise

See also
 Administrative divisions of India

References

 
Community development blocks in West Bengal
Economic planning in India